Asleep at the Wheel is an American Western swing group that was formed in Paw Paw, West Virginia, and is based in Austin, Texas. The band has won nine Grammy Awards since their 1970 inception, released over twenty albums, and has charted more than 21 singles on the Billboard country charts. Their highest-charting single, "The Letter That Johnny Walker Read", peaked at No. 10 in 1975.

History

Beginnings to Austin
In 1969, Ray Benson and Lucky Oceans (Reuben Gosfield) co-founded Asleep at the Wheel in Paw Paw, West Virginia, and soon after they found themselves opening for Alice Cooper and Hot Tuna in Washington, D.C. A year later, they moved to East Oakland, California, at the invitation of Commander Cody and His Lost Planet Airmen. After being mentioned in Rolling Stone magazine by Van Morrison, they landed a record deal with United Artists. In 1973, their debut album, Comin' Right at Ya, was released by United Artists. At the invitation of Willie Nelson, they left Oakland for Austin in 1974.

1974–1979
In 1974, Asleep at the Wheel released its self-titled second album, with a cover of Louis Jordan's "Choo Choo Ch'Boogie", which was the band's first single to hit the country charts. The following year had the release of Texas Gold, with the top-ten Country hit single "The Letter That Johnny Walker Read". In addition, they played on PBS's Austin City Limits, where they have since performed a record-setting 10 times. In 1977, the band was voted Best Country Western Band by Rolling Stone and was awarded the Touring Band of the Year by the Academy of Country Music. They also went on tour with Emmylou Harris in Europe. The following year, they recorded a cover of Count Basie's song "One O'Clock Jump". Also in 1980, they appeared in the movie Roadie, along with Meat Loaf, Blondie, and Art Carney. By the end of the decade, the band recorded their first live album, Served Live, at the Austin Opera House.

1980–1989
The 1980s became a turbulent decade for the band. After moving to MCA, co-founder Lucky Oceans left, followed in September 1986 by Chris O'Connell due to her pregnancy. Asleep at the Wheel gathered a large amount of debt that required it to work on commercials and movie soundtracks.  This band produced the soundtrack for the film Liar's Moon.

In 1985, the band released a virtually ignored self-titled album. By the late 1980s, Ray Benson had done some producing, allowing the band a second chance with Epic Records. In 1987, the band released 10, which won them their second Grammy for Best Country Instrumental, helping to launch their comeback. The album also had contributions from legendary fiddle player and onetime Texas Playboys member Johnny Gimble. The following year, the band released Western Standard Time, which won them another Grammy for Best Country Instrumental. The late 1980s also had the growth of Jann Browne as a solo vocalist in the group; she would later embark on a solo career on Curb Records.

1990–1999
The band moved to Arista Records and released the album, Keepin' Me Up Nights. Soon after, the band had turnover. Among its new members was former solo singer Rosie Flores, who joined in 1997. In 1991, Ray Benson directed the music and co-starred in the movie Wild Texas Wind with Dolly Parton. In honor of the 66th anniversary of Route 66, the band launched the Route 66 Tour. In 1993, the band released an instant hit with several guest musicians, A Tribute to the Music of Bob Wills and the Texas Playboys, to much critical acclaim. Two years later, the band celebrated their 25th anniversary by releasing The Wheel Keeps on Rollin. In 1999, the band and DreamWorks released Ride with Bob, as their second tribute album to Bob Wills. This album also enjoyed immediate success and garnered the band two Grammy wins, one for Best Country Instrumental, and the other for Best Package Design.

According to Rolling Stone magazine, Ray Benson "didn't just enlist the obvious Wills fans" in this tribute album to Bob Wills like Merle Haggard, Willie Nelson, and Lyle Lovett. He also brought in some of country's young lions the Dixie Chicks, Tim McGraw, and Lee Ann Womack, some pop stars", including Shawn Colvin, the Squirrel Nut Zippers, and fellow country preservationists such as Dwight Yoakam.

2000–present
In 2000, the Chicks were nominated for an award for Vocal Event of the Year for "Roly Poly" with Asleep at the Wheel from the Country Music Association. That same year, the band toured with Bob Dylan and George Strait. Benson recorded a tribute to Wills and Texas swing music, including Dwight Yoakam, Vince Gill, Merle Haggard, the Chicks, and Willie Nelson. They were scheduled to play at the White House on the fateful September 11, 2001. In 2003, the band released Live at Billy Bob's Texas, and by the end of the decade, the band had released two more albums: Reinventing the Wheel, an entirely new set of songs, including a collaboration with The Blind Boys of Alabama, and a two-disc set Kings of Texas Swing. In 2007, their second Christmas album was released, Santa Loves to Boogie.

Asleep at the Wheel received six Austin Music Awards for their efforts in 2007, including Band of the Year, Songwriter of the Year (Benson), Country Band of the Year, Record Producer of the Year (Benson), Male Vocals of the Year (Benson), and Acoustic Guitar Player of the Year (McQueen).

Members

Current members
Ray Benson – lead vocals, lead guitar 
Jason Baczynski – drums, percussion 
Katie Shore – co-lead vocals, fiddle 
Dennis Ludiker – fiddle, mandolin, backing vocals 
Connor Forsyth – piano, organ, accordion, backing vocals 
Josh Hoag – bass 
Flavio Pasquetto – steel guitars 
Joey Colarusso – saxophone

Discography

Awards and nominations
Asleep at the Wheel have won eight Grammy Awards out of 27 nominations. They have also been nominated for 12 Country Music Association Awards. In 1977, they won the Academy of Country Music Award for Touring Band of the Year and have been nominated an additional nine times.

References

External links
Asleep at the Wheel official website
 
A Ride with Bob
Ray Benson site
Floyd Domino site

 

American country music groups
Grammy Award winners
Musical groups established in 1970
Swing revival ensembles
Western swing musical groups
Musical groups from West Virginia
Musical groups from Austin, Texas
1970 establishments in Texas
Stony Plain Records artists
Epic Records artists
DreamWorks Records artists
Proper Records artists
MCA Records artists
Thirty Tigers artists